Jussi Kujala (born 4 April 1983 in Tampere) is a Finnish former footballer. Having started his career as an attacking midfielder, he has since dropped deeper down the field. He was the captain of the Finnish U21 national team in the 2006 UEFA European Under-21 Football Championship qualifiers.

Club career

Tampere United
Kujala made his debut for United in 2000 and he gained 10 caps and one goal for the team.

Ajax
After Tampere United he spent four seasons playing in the junior and reserve teams of Ajax Amsterdam.

Return to Tampere United
He returned to Tampere United in 2004. As the club had financial difficulties in 2009 he was allowed to leave the team.

TPS
He transferred to TPS Turku during the summer 2009 transfer window.

De Graafschap
In January 2010 he left TPS Turku and signed with Dutch side De Graafschap on a free transfer.

Return to Ilves
In September 2012, Kujala signed a contract with his old junior team Ilves. Ilves was promoted to Ykkönen at the end of the season.

KuPS
On 27 November Kuopion Palloseura announced that they had signed Kujala for two years.

Ilves and retirement 
In January 2015 he signed a one-year contract with FC Ilves.

He announced his retirement in December 2015.

International career
Kujala made his international debut in Finland's national team in 2004 against Oman.

Honours
De Graafschap
 Eerste Divisie: 2009–10

Career statistics

International

Club
Tampere United
Veikkausliiga (2): 2006, 2007
Finnish Cup: 2007
Finnish League Cup: 2009

De Graafschap
Eerste Divisie: 2009–10

Ilves
Kakkonen: 2012

References

External links
  
 
 
 
 Player stats - Voetbal International

1983 births
Living people
Footballers from Tampere
Association football defenders
Association football midfielders
Finnish footballers
Finland international footballers
Tampere United players
AFC Ajax players
Turun Palloseura footballers
De Graafschap players
Veikkausliiga players
Eredivisie players
Eerste Divisie players
Finnish expatriate footballers
Expatriate footballers in the Netherlands
Finnish expatriate sportspeople in the Netherlands